Graeme Robertson Forbes is a Scottish-American philosopher and logician and Professor of Philosophy at the University of Colorado Boulder and former Celia Scott Weatherhead Distinguished Professor at Tulane University.

He should not be confused with the British philosopher Graeme A Forbes, based at the University of Kent.

Books
 Attitude Problems, Oxford University Press, September 2006
 Languages of Possibility, 1989
 The Metaphysics of Modality, Oxford, 1985
Modern Logic, Oxford University Press, 1994

References

External links
 Graeme Forbes

21st-century American philosophers
Philosophy academics
Tulane University faculty
Living people
American logicians
Metaphysicians
University of Colorado Boulder faculty
Semanticists
Year of birth missing (living people)
Alumni of the University of Oxford